Muntenia (also known in English as Greater Wallachia) is a historical region of Romania, part of Wallachia (also, sometimes considered Wallachia proper, as Muntenia, Țara Românească, and the seldom used Valahia are synonyms in Romanian). It is situated between the Danube (south and east), the Carpathian Mountains (the Transylvanian Alps branch) and Moldavia (both north), and the Olt River to the west. The latter river is the border between Muntenia and Oltenia (or Lesser Wallachia). Part of the traditional border between Wallachia/Muntenia and Moldavia was formed by the rivers Milcov and Siret.

Geography

Muntenia includes București - Ilfov, Sud - Muntenia, and part of the Sud-Est development regions. It consists of ten counties entirely:
 Brăila
 Buzău
 Călărași
 Argeș
 Dâmbovița
 Giurgiu
 Ialomița
 Ilfov
 Prahova

And parts of four others:
 Teleorman (the entire county with the exception of Islaz)
 Vrancea (southern part)
 Vâlcea (eastern part)
 Olt (eastern part)

Romania's capital city, Bucharest, is situated in Muntenia. Other important cities are: 
 Brăila
 Buzău
 Pitești
 Ploiești
 Târgoviște

References

External links

 
Wallachia
Historical regions in Romania